Hobbs is an unincorporated community located in Bullitt County, Kentucky, United States. It was also known as Quarry Switch.

References

Unincorporated communities in Bullitt County, Kentucky
Unincorporated communities in Kentucky